The 2019 Rugby League European play-off tournament was the final phase of European qualifying to the 2021 Rugby League World Cup, played in October and November 2019. It featured six nations, five of whom have come through the previous phases of European qualifying - 2018 European Championship, 2018 European Championship B and 2018–19 European Championship C. The competition was played in two groups of three with the winners and runners up in each group qualifying for the World Cup.

Teams and pool draw

The draw for the two groups was made on 12 December 2018. Teams with the same seeding will not play in the same group, each group will be a single round-robin with each team playing each other once. Group A was drawn as Ireland, Italy, and Spain, and Group B as Scotland, Russia, and the winners of the Euro C play-off game. Greece defeated Norway in May 2019 to take the position in Group B.

No specific reason was given for Russia's withdrawal, though the decision was foreshadowed by allegations from the Serbian Rugby League that Russia's Association of Rugby League Clubs did not provide the necessary paperwork for VISA removal for their Australian-based players ahead of their Euro B match in Moscow in October 2018.

Fixtures

Group A

Notes:
 This match was originally fixtured to be played at Estadio Matías Prats in Torredonjimeno.

Group B

References

2019 in Scottish sport
2019 in Irish sport
2019 in Serbian sport
2019 in Italian sport
2019 in Spanish sport
2019 in rugby league
2021 Rugby League World Cup
European rugby league competitions
Rugby League European play-off tournament
Rugby League European play-off tournament